Wilson River can refer to:

Wilson River (Alaska), one of two rivers in Alaska in the United States
Wilson River (New South Wales) in New South Wales, Australia
Wilson River (New Zealand) in New Zealand
Wilson River (Nunavut) in Nunavut in Canada
Wilson River (Oregon) on the coast of Oregon in the United States
Wilson River (Queensland) in South West Queensland, Australia
Wilson River (Western Australia), in the Kimberley

See also
Willson River, South Australia
 Wilsons River (New South Wales)